David Martyn Lloyd-Jones (1899–1981) was a Welsh Protestant minister and medical doctor who was influential in the Calvinist wing of the British evangelical movement in the 20th century. For almost 30 years, he was the minister of Westminster Chapel in London.

Biography

Early life and ministry
Lloyd-Jones was born in Cardiff on 20 December 1899 and raised in Llangeitho, Cardiganshire. His father was a grocer, and he had two brothers: Harold died during the 1918 flu pandemic, while Vincent went on to become a High Court judge.  Llangeitho is associated with the Welsh Methodist revival, as it was the location of Daniel Rowland's ministry. Attending a London grammar school between 1914 and 1917 and then St Bartholomew's Hospital as a medical student, in 1921 he started work as assistant to the Royal Physician, Sir Thomas Horder. Lloyd-Jones obtained a medical degree from the University of London, and became a Member of the Royal College of Physicians.  After struggling for two years over what he sensed was a calling to preach, in 1927 Lloyd-Jones returned to Wales, having married Bethan Phillips (with whom he later had two children, Elizabeth and Ann), accepting an invitation to minister at a church in Aberavon (Port Talbot).

Westminster Chapel

After a decade ministering in Aberavon, in 1939 he went back to London, where he had been appointed as associate pastor of Westminster Chapel, working alongside G. Campbell Morgan.  The day before he was officially to be accepted into his new position, World War II broke out in Europe. During the same year, he became the president of the Inter-Varsity Fellowship of Students, known today as the Universities and Colleges Christian Fellowship. During the war he and his family moved to Haslemere, Surrey.  In 1943 Morgan retired, leaving Lloyd-Jones as the sole Pastor of Westminster Chapel.

Lloyd-Jones was strongly opposed to liberal Christianity, which had become a part of many Christian denominations; he regarded it as aberrant.  He disagreed with the broad church approach and encouraged evangelical Christians (particularly Anglicans) to leave their existing denominations.  He believed that true Christian fellowship was possible only among those who shared common convictions regarding the nature of the faith.

Lloyd-Jones was well known for his style of expository preaching, and the Sunday morning and evening meetings at which he officiated drew crowds of several thousand, as did the Friday evening Bible studies, which were, in effect, sermons in the same style.  He would take many months, even years, to expound a chapter of the Bible verse by verse. His sermons would often be around fifty minutes to an hour in length, attracting many students from universities and colleges in London. His sermons were also transcribed and printed (virtually verbatim) in the weekly Westminster Record.

Evangelical controversy
Lloyd-Jones provoked a major dispute in 1966 when, at the National Assembly of Evangelicals organised by the Evangelical Alliance, he called on evangelicals to withdraw from denominations in which they were "united with the people who deny and are opposed to the essential matters of salvation." This was interpreted as referring primarily to evangelicals within the Church of England, although there is disagreement over whether this was his intention as there were other denominations with liberal wings.  There was also disagreement as to what the new ecclesiology he was proposing would look like in practice, although he spoke of “a fellowship, or an association, of evangelical churches.”

However, Lloyd-Jones was criticised by the leading Anglican evangelical John Stott. Although Stott was not scheduled to speak, he used his position as chairman of the meeting to oppose Lloyd-Jones publicly, stating that his opinion was against history and the example of the Bible.  This open clash between the two elder statesmen of British evangelicalism was widely reported in the Christian press and caused considerable controversy. Stott later apologised to Lloyd-Jones for abusing his position as chairman, and he greatly admired Lloyd-Jones's work, often quoting him in his own books. 

Yet the disagreement remained and the following year saw the first National Evangelical Anglican Congress, which was held at Keele University. At this conference, largely due to Stott's influence, evangelical Anglicans committed themselves to full participation in the Church of England, rejecting the separationist approach proposed by Lloyd-Jones.

These two conferences effectively fixed the direction of a large part of the British evangelical community.  Although there is an ongoing debate as to the exact nature of Lloyd-Jones's views, they undoubtedly caused the two groupings to adopt diametrically opposed positions. These positions, and the resulting split, continued largely unchanged, at least through 1996.

Later life

Lloyd-Jones retired from his ministry at Westminster Chapel in 1968, following a major operation. He spoke of a belief that God had stopped him from continuing to preach through the New Testament book of the Letter to the Romans in his Friday evening Bible study exposition because he did not personally know enough about "joy in the Holy Spirit", which was to be his next sermon (based on Romans 14:17). For the rest of his life, he concentrated on editing his sermons to be published, counselling other ministers, answering letters and attending conferences. Perhaps his most famous publication is a 14 volume series of commentaries on the Epistle to the Romans, the first volume of which was published in 1970.

Despite spending most of his life living and ministering in England, Lloyd-Jones was proud of his roots in Wales. He best expressed his concern for his home country through his support of the Evangelical Movement of Wales: he was a regular speaker at their conferences, preaching in both English and Welsh. Since his death, the movement has published various books, in English and Welsh, bringing together selections of his sermons and articles.

Lloyd-Jones preached for the last time on 8 June 1980 at Barcombe Baptist Chapel. After a lifetime of work, he died peacefully in his sleep at Ealing on 1 March 1981, St David's Day. He was buried at Newcastle Emlyn, near Cardigan, west Wales. A well-attended thanksgiving service was held at Westminster Chapel on 6 April.

Since his death, there have been various publications regarding Lloyd-Jones and his work, most popularly a biography in two volumes by Iain Murray.

Legacy

Charismatic Movement 
Martyn Lloyd-Jones has admirers from many different denominations in the Christian Church today. One much-discussed aspect of his legacy is his relationship to the Charismatic Movement.  Respected by leaders of many churches associated with this movement, although not directly associated with them, he did teach the Baptism with the Holy Spirit as a distinct experience rather than conversion and the regeneration of the Holy Spirit. He claimed that those who held to a single baptism in the Spirit were "quenching the Spirit." Indeed, towards the end of his life he urged his listeners to actively seek an experience of the Holy Spirit.  For instance, in his exposition of Ephesians 6:10–13, published in 1976, he says: Do you know anything of this fire? If you do not, confess it to God and acknowledge it.  Repent, and ask Him to send the Spirit and His love into you until you are melted and moved, until you are filled with his love divine, and know His love to you, and rejoice in it as his child, and look forward to the hope of the coming glory. "Quench not the Spirit", but rather "be filled with the Spirit" and "rejoice in Christ Jesus".

Part of Lloyd-Jones's stress of the Christian's need of the baptism with the Holy Spirit was due to his belief that this provides an overwhelming assurance of God's love to the Christian, and thereby enables him to boldly witness for Christ to an unbelieving world.

Aside from his insistence that the baptism with the Spirit is a work of Jesus Christ distinct from regeneration, rather than the filling of the Holy Spirit, Lloyd-Jones also opposed cessationism, claiming that the doctrine is not founded upon Scripture. In fact, he requested that Banner of Truth Trust, the publishing company he co-founded, publish his works on the subject only after his death. Lloyd-Jones continued to proclaim the necessity of the active working of God in the world, and the need for God to miraculously demonstrate His power so that Christian preachers and others witnessing for Christ might otherwise gain a hearing in a contemporary world that is hostile to Christianity. In Lloyd-Jones's words,

Preaching 
Lloyd-Jones seldom agreed to preach live on television – the exact number of occasions is not known, but it was most likely only once or twice.  His reasoning behind this decision was that this type of "controlled" preaching, preaching that is constrained by time limits, "militates against the freedom of the Spirit."  In other words, he believed that the preacher should be free to follow the leading of the Holy Spirit concerning the length of time in which he is allowed to preach. He recorded that he once asked a television executive who wanted him to preach on television, "What would happen to your programmes if the Holy Spirit suddenly descended upon the preacher and possessed him; what would happen to your programmes?"

Perhaps the greatest aspect of Lloyd-Jones's legacy has to do with his preaching. Lloyd-Jones was one of the most influential preachers of the twentieth century. Many volumes of his sermons have been published by Banner of Truth, as well as other publishing companies.  In his book , Lloyd-Jones describes his views on preaching, or what might be called his doctrine of homiletics.  In this book, he defines preaching as "Logic on fire." The meaning of this definition is demonstrated throughout the book in which he describes his own preaching style that had developed over his many years of ministry.

His preaching style may be summarised as "logic on fire" for several reasons. First, he believed that the use of logic was vital for the preacher, but his view of logic was not the same as that of the Enlightenment. This is why he called it logic "on fire". The fire has to do with the activity and power of the Holy Spirit. He therefore believed that preaching was the logical demonstration of the truth of a given passage of Scripture with the aid, or unction, of the Holy Spirit.  This view manifested itself in the form of Lloyd-Jones's sermons. Lloyd-Jones believed that true preaching was always expository.  This means he believed that the primary purpose of the sermon was to reveal and expand the primary teaching of the scripture under consideration.  Once the primary teaching was revealed, he would then logically expand this theme, demonstrating that it was a biblical doctrine by showing that it was taught in other passages in the Bible, and using logic to demonstrate its practical use and necessity for the hearer.  With this being the case, he laboured in his book Preaching and Preachers to caution young preachers against what he deemed as "commentary-style" preaching as well as "topical" preaching.

Lloyd-Jones's preaching style was therefore set apart by his sound exposition of biblical doctrine and his fire and passion in its delivery. He is thereby known as a preacher who continued in the Puritan tradition of experimental preaching. A famous quote on the effects of Lloyd-Jones's preaching is given by theologian and preacher J. I. Packer, who wrote that he had "never heard such preaching."  It came to him "with the force of electric shock, bringing to at least one of his listeners more of a sense of God than any other man".

Once, while unfolding to his congregation the internal work of the Holy Spirit in the life of a Christian, Lloyd-Jones marvelled at his experience preaching. I say it again to the glory of God, this pulpit is the most romantic place in the universe as far as I'm concerned, and for this reason, that I never know what's going to happen when I get here. Never.  My anticipations are often falsified on both sides. This is wonderful. The temptation for the preacher, you see, is to think that if he has prepared what he regards as a good sermon, it's going to be a wonderful service, and it sometimes can be a very bad one. On the other hand, the poor man may have had a very difficult and a trying week. He may have been very ill, a thousand and one things may have happened to him, and he may go into the pulpit with fear and trembling, feeling that he hasn't done his work; he's got nothing. And it may be one of the most glorious services he has ever had the privilege of conducting. Why? Because he doesn't control the power [within of the Holy Spirit]. It varies. And not only in preaching but in daily life and experience. It is the well of water that is within us and we don't control it. It controls us.

Lloyd-Jones was also an avid supporter of the Evangelical Library in London.

Recordings Trust
Shortly after his death, a charitable trust was established to continue Lloyd-Jones's ministry by making recordings of his sermons available. The organisation currently has 1,600 sermons available and also produces a weekly radio programme using this material.

Works
 .
 .
 .
 .
 .
 .
 .
 .
 .
 .
 .
 .
 .
 .
 .
 .
 .
 .
 .
 .
 .
 .
 .
 .
 .
 .
 .
 .
 
 .
 .
 .
 .
 
 .
 .
 .
 .
 .
 .
 .
 .
 .
 .
 .
 .
 .
 .
 .
 .
 .
 .
 .
 .
 .
 .
 .
 .
 .
 .
 .
 .
 .
 .
 .
 .
 .
 .
 .
 .
 .
 .
 .
 .
 .
 .
 .
 .

References

Bibliography
 .
 
 Catherwood, Christopher. 2015. Martyn Lloyd-Jones: His Life and Relevance for the 21st Century. Crossway.
 
 
 
 .

External links
 .
 .
 .
  on Martyn Lloyd-Jones.
 .

1899 births
1981 deaths
20th-century evangelicals
20th-century Presbyterian ministers
20th-century Welsh clergy
Alumni of the Medical College of St Bartholomew's Hospital
Alumni of the University of London
British Christian writers
British sermon writers
Calvinist and Reformed writers
Evangelical writers
People educated at St Marylebone Grammar School
Welsh Protestant ministers and clergy
Welsh evangelicals
Welsh evangelists
Welsh Presbyterian ministers
Welsh-speaking clergy
Welsh-speaking writers
Writers from Cardiff